Anoplotheriidae is an extinct family of even-toed ungulates (order Artiodactyla). They were endemic to Western Europe during the Eocene and Oligocene epochs about 48—23 million years ago (Mya), existing for about 25 million years. They disappeared at the end of the Oligocene, leaving no survivors today.

They were most likely mid-sized terrestrial herbivores not too distantly related to camels, but smaller and low-slung with long and thick tails, and rather generalistic. The climate during their time was warmer than today, and their habitats were probably subtropical or even tropical, with plentiful rainfall and abundant vegetation. Tropical rainforest may at least initially have occurred all over the Anoplotheriidae's range. Ecologically, they may have resembled a large duiker of our time (e.g. the similarly sized yellow-backed duiker Cephalophus silvicultor), foraging in dense growth where their low builds would have been advantageous.

Systematics and taxonomy
The family Anoplotheriidae was assigned to Tesserachenae by Gray in 1821, to Belluae by Bonaparte (who named it Anoplotheriina) in 1850; to Artiodactyla by Cope in 1889, to Ruminantia by Gregory in 1910, and finally to its own superfamily Anoplotherioidea by Romer in 1966.

Here, the Anoplotherioidea are also considered to include the Cainotheriidae and Dacrytheriidae. Other authors treat the former as more distantly related and sometimes include the Dacrytheriidae in the Anoplotheriidae as a third subfamily, Dacrytheriinae. On the other hand, the Robiaciinae can be considered the most basal branch of the Anoplotheriinae, resulting in no subfamilies at all being recognized, or be elevated to a fourth (or third) family in the Anoplotherioidea.

The subfamilies and genera included here are:

Subfamily Robiaciinae Sudre, 1977 (basal; disputed)
 Genus Robiacina Sudre, 1969

Subfamily Anoplotheriinae Gray, 1821 (advanced)
 Genus Anoplotherium
 Genus Deilotherium Filhol, 1882
 Genus Diplartiopus (tentatively placed here)
 Genus Diplobune Rutimeyer, 1862
 Genus Duerotherium
 Genus Ephelcomenus Hurzeler, 1938
 Genus Hyracodontherium (tentatively placed here)
 Genus Robiatherium Sudre, 1988

References

Sources
 http://www.helsinki.fi/~mhaaramo/metazoa/deuterostoma/chordata/synapsida/eutheria/artiodactyla/suina/anoplotheroidea.html

Tylopoda
Eocene even-toed ungulates
Eocene first appearances
Prehistoric mammals of Europe
Rupelian extinctions
Prehistoric mammal families